A by-election was held in the federal riding of South Surrey—White Rock in British Columbia on December 11, 2017 following the resignation of Conservative MP Dianne Watts. The seat was gained for the Liberals by Gordie Hogg.

The by-election result was rare as it saw a seat gain for a governing party.

The by election was held on the same day as 3 others across Canada; Battlefords—Lloydminster in Alberta, Bonavista—Burin—Trinity in Newfoundland and Labrador and Scarborough—Agincourt in Ontario.

Background

Constituency 
The riding is anchored by the cities of Surrey and White Rock.

Representation 

The riding of South Surrey—White Rock was newly created for the 2015 election. A notionally safe seat for the Conservatives, the result was tighter than expected. Conservative candidate Dianne Watts won over the Liberal candidate with a majority of under 2000 votes. The seat was vacated on September 30, 2017, after Watts announced on September 24, 2017, that she would be resigning her seat to enter provincial politics and seek the leadership of the British Columbia Liberal Party.

Campaign 
Former federal cabinet minister and Delta—Richmond East MP Kerry-Lynne Findlay defeated Fraser Institute policy analyst and former BC Liberal staffer David Hunt and police officer Bryan Tepper for the Conservative Party nomination.

Former White Rock Mayor and Surrey-White Rock MLA Gordie Hogg was acclaimed as the Liberal Party candidate. A rumoured candidate for the nomination was Judith Higginbotham, a former Surrey city councillor and the riding's Liberal candidate in the 2015 federal election.

Mortgage broker Jonathan Silveira was acclaimed the NDP candidate on November 19.

The Speaker's warrant regarding the vacancy was received on October 3, 2017; under the Parliament of Canada Act the writ for a by-election had to be dropped no later than April 1, 2018, 180 days after the Chief Electoral Officer was officially notified of the vacancy via a warrant issued by the Speaker.

Results

2015 results

References

See also 

 By-elections to the 42nd Canadian Parliament

2017 elections in Canada
2017 in British Columbia
Federal by-elections in British Columbia
Politics of Surrey, British Columbia
White Rock, British Columbia